Typhlobarbus nudiventris is a vulnerable species of cyprinid fish endemic to Jianshui County in Yunnan, China. Like other cavefish, it lacks pigmentation and its eyes are degenerated. It is the only species in its genus.

References

Cyprinid fish of Asia
Freshwater fish of China
Endemic fauna of Yunnan
Cave fish
Fish described in 1982
Taxonomy articles created by Polbot